Leandro Fernandes Cardoso (born 11 May 1999) is a Portuguese professional footballer who plays for Marítimo B as a forward.

Club career
Born in Figueira da Foz, Cardoso began playing at hometown club Associação Naval 1º de Maio and also had brief youth spells at Sporting CP and FC Porto before joining Académica de Coimbra in 2016. On 12 January 2017, he made his professional debut in a 2016–17 LigaPro match at home to S.C. Olhanense, as an 82nd-minute substitute for Ernest Ohemeng in a 2–0 win.

After two more appearances off the bench for the Students, Cardoso transferred to C.S. Marítimo in 2018 and signed his first professional contract that December, after good performances for their under-23 side. The following 14 April he made his Primeira Liga debut, playing the final two minutes of a 2–0 home win over C.D. Feirense in place of René Santos, and made two other cameos over the rest of the season.

References

External links

Stats and profile at LPFP 

1999 births
Living people
People from Figueira da Foz
Portuguese footballers
Association football forwards
Primeira Liga players
Liga Portugal 2 players
Segunda Divisão players
Associação Académica de Coimbra – O.A.F. players
C.S. Marítimo players
Portugal youth international footballers
Sportspeople from Coimbra District